Underwood may refer to:

People
Underwood (surname), people with the surname

Places

United States
Underwood, Shelby County, Alabama
Underwood, Indiana
Underwood, Iowa
Underwood, Minnesota
Underwood, New York
Underwood, North Dakota
Underwood, Washington
Underwood Township, Redwood County, Minnesota
Underwood-Petersville, Alabama
New Underwood, South Dakota

United Kingdom
Underwood, Devon, a location
Underwood, Newport, village in Wales
Underwood, Nottinghamshire, village in England
Underwood, Pembrokeshire, a location
Weston Underwood, Buckinghamshire, village in England
Weston Underwood, Derbyshire, village in England 
Wotton Underwood, village in England

Australia
Underwood, Queensland, a suburb of Logan City, Australia
Underwood, Tasmania, a locality

Canada
Underwood, Ontario
Underwood, Bruce County, Ontario

Other uses
trees and shrubs in the understorey of a forest
the wood material under a veneer layer
Underwood & Underwood, early producer and distributor of stereoscopic images
Underwood-Memorial Hospital, Woodbury, New Jersey, USA
Underwood tariff (see Revenue Act of 1913), US tax law
Underwood Typewriter Company, typewriter manufacturer
USS Underwood (FFG-36), US Navy ship
William Underwood Company, 19th- and 20th-century maker of condiments and packaged meat and fish
Underwood Dudley, American mathematician

See also
Undervud, Ukrainian musical group
Justice Underwood (disambiguation)